The Church of the Holy Trinity is a Roman Catholic parish church in the Roman Catholic Archdiocese of New York, located at 209 West 82nd Street near Amsterdam Avenue in the Upper West Side neighborhood of Manhattan, New York City. The parish was established in 1898.

Buildings
The church was built 1910–1912 to the designs of Joseph Hubert McGuire. It has a dome of Guastavino tile. According to Frederick D. Taylor in his article Medieval New York - Holy Trinity Church the church was built deliberately in the Byzantine style, unusual for the time, and has been "considered to be one of the finest examples of Byzantine architecture in this country."

References 

Roman Catholic churches completed in 1912
20th-century Roman Catholic church buildings in the United States
Romanesque Revival church buildings in New York City
Religious organizations established in 1898
Roman Catholic churches in Manhattan
Byzantine Revival architecture in New York City
Upper West Side
1898 establishments in New York City